Marcel Anthoon (born 20 October 1933) is a Belgian former swimmer. He competed in the men's 4 × 200 metre freestyle relay at the 1952 Summer Olympics.

References

External links
 

1933 births
Living people
Olympic swimmers of Belgium
Swimmers at the 1952 Summer Olympics
Swimmers from Antwerp
Belgian male freestyle swimmers